Gérard Darrieu (1925–2004) was a French actor.

Selected filmography

1950: Three Telegrams (directed by Henri Decoin) - Jeune dragueur
1951: Juliette, or Key of Dreams - Un prisonnier (uncredited)
1951: Boîte de nuit - Le groom
1951: Dupont Barbès
1952: Love Is Not a Sin - Un déménageur (uncredited)
1952: Three Women - Un hussard
1952: Le jugement de Dieu - (uncredited)
1952: Rires de Paris
1952: Crimson Curtain - Un machiniste au théâtre
1954: Poisson d'avril (directed by Gilles Grangier) - Le livreur de la machine à laver (uncredited)
1954: Le vicomte de Bragelonne
1955: Sophie et le Crime - L'agent cycliste au billet de loterie (uncredited)
1956: People of No Importance - Le routier au lapin
1956: Marie Antoinette Queen of France - Garde du Petit-Trianon (uncredited)
1956: Gervaise - Charles
1957: The Crucible - Cheever
1957: Sénéchal the Magnificent - Un gangster (uncredited)
1957: On Foot, on Horse, and on Wheels - Robert (uncredited)
1958: Maigret Sets a Trap - Un serveur (uncredited)
1958: Elevator to the Gallows - Maurice
1958: Les Misérables - Feuilly - un révolutionnaire
1958: Incognito - Un agent
1958: Sans Famille - Le braconnier
1958: One Life - Un pêcheur
1958: Young Sinners - Le camionneur
1959: Le fauve est lâché - (uncredited)
1959: Les naufrageurs
1959: Les Dragueurs - Un ami de Freddy
1959: Un témoin dans la ville - Pierre - le collègue d'Ancelin
1959: An Angel on Wheels - Chef de l'aéroport
1959: Signé Arsène Lupin - Un acolyte
1960: Un couple - M. Mignon
1960: The Cat Shows Her Claws - Jean-Lou
1960: Normandie - Niémen - Le Guen
1960: Lovers on a Tightrope - Un gendarme
1960: La 1000eme fenêtre - Billois
1960: Comment qu'elle est? - Paulo (uncredited)
1960: Le caïd - Le flic conférence
1960: The Nabob Affair
1961: The Fenouillard Family - Souris-Bibi
1961: The Three Musketeers
1962: The Elusive Corporal - L'homme qui louche / The cross-eyed man
1962: Arsène Lupin contre Arsène Lupin - Un matelot du "Danaé" (uncredited)
1963: Kriss Romani - Le patron du bar (uncredited)
1964: Laissez tirer les tireurs - Raoul
1964: The Great Spy Chase - L'agent Fiduc
1964: Weekend at Dunkirk - Un lieutenant
1964: The Gorillas - Un complice de Lebavard
1965: Le majordome - (uncredited)
1966: La sentinelle endormie - Boissier
1966: Les malabars sont au parfum - Petrossian - un agent russe
1966: Mademoiselle - Boulet
1966: Who Are You, Polly Maggoo? - Le caméraman
1966: Sale temps pour les mouches - Neunoeil
1967: Shock Troops - Le camionneur
1968: Z - Barone
1969: L'Auvergnat et l'Autobus - Le receveur #2
1970: The Confession - Un policier
1971: Don't Deliver Us from Evil - Émile
1971: Laisse aller... c'est une valse
1973: Le Gang des otages - Maurice Perret
1973: The Dominici Affair - Clovis Dominici
1973: Décembre
1975: The Track - Maurois
1978: Paradiso - Le père
1980: My American Uncle - Léon Veestrate
1981: Le Professionnel - L'instructeur Picard
1981: Julien Fontanes, magistrat (TV Series, directed by Jean Pignol) - Émile Digoin
1981: Sans Famille (TV Series) - Père Barberin
1983: Sarah - A Belgian
1983: Les princes - Le gendarme
1984: P'tit Con (directed by Gérard Lauzier) - the Legionnaire
1991: Netchaïev est de retour - L'imprimeur

1925 births
2004 deaths
People from Ardennes (department)
French male film actors
French male television actors
French male stage actors
20th-century French male actors